Amanda Gutierres dos Santos (born 18 March 2001) is a Brazilian footballer who plays as a forward for Palmeiras.

Club career
Gutierres was born in Santa Cruz do Monte Castelo, Paraná, and moved to the São Paulo state to start her career in 2016.

In 2018, after a brief period at Foz Cataratas, Gutierres moved to Santos. Initially assigned to the under-18 squad, she made her first team debut in the following year.

On 20 December 2021, Gutierres opted to leave Santos after not renewing her contract. The following 11 January, she was announced at French club Bordeaux.

Honours
Santos
Copa Paulista de Futebol Feminino: 2020

References

2001 births
Living people
Sportspeople from Paraná (state)
Brazilian women's footballers
Women's association football forwards
Campeonato Brasileiro de Futebol Feminino Série A1 players
Santos FC (women) players
Sociedade Esportiva Palmeiras (women) players
Division 1 Féminine players
FC Girondins de Bordeaux (women) players
Brazilian expatriate women's footballers
Brazilian expatriate sportspeople in France
Expatriate women's footballers in France
21st-century Brazilian women